Emmanuel Labrada Aliaga (born 19 January 1994) is a Cuban international football player.

Club career
Labrada played for his native provincial team Granma, but joined Holguín ahead of the 2013 Clausura.

International career
Labrada played three games at the 2013 FIFA U-20 World Cup and made his senior international debut versus Indonesia in March 2014. He defected to the United States in October 2015 during the 2015 CONCACAF Men's Olympic Qualifying Championship.

References

External links
 

Living people
1994 births
Cuban footballers
Cuba international footballers
Cuba youth international footballers
Defecting Cuban footballers
Association football defenders
FC Villa Clara players
People from Jiguaní
21st-century Cuban people